Trigonogenius is a genus of spider beetles in the family Ptinidae. There are about six described species in Trigonogenius.

Species
These six species belong to the genus Trigonogenius:
 Trigonogenius denticulatus Wichmann & H.E., 1915a
 Trigonogenius fallax Hagedorn, 1912c
 Trigonogenius globosus Solier, 1849
 Trigonogenius globulus Solier, 1849 (globular spider beetle)
 Trigonogenius imitans Eggers, 1920
 Trigonogenius similis Eggers, 1920

References

Further reading

External links

Bostrichoidea
Articles created by Qbugbot